The Logistic Regiment "Garibaldi" is a military logistics regiment of the Italian Army based in Persano in Campania. The regiment is highest decorated logistic unit of the army and operationally assigned to the Bersaglieri Brigade "Garibaldi".

History 
In 1963 the Italian Army reorganized its divisions and created autonomous brigades under a division's command. Consequently on 1 June 1963 the I Services Battalion "Ariete" was formed in Pordenone to support the Armored Division "Ariete"'s I Brigade, which was centered around the 8th Bersaglieri Regiment. On 1 October 1968 the brigades of the divisions were disbanded and the I Services Battalion was assigned to the division's Services Grouping "Ariete".

During the 1975 army reform the army disbanded the regimental level and newly independent battalions were granted for the first time their own flags. On 1 November 1975 the I Services Battalion was renamed Logistic Battalion "Garibaldi" and assigned to the 8th Mechanized Brigade "Garibaldi". On 12 November 1976 the President of the Italian Republic Giovanni Leone issued decree 846, which granted the new units their flags.

For its conduct and work after the 1976 Friuli earthquake the battalion was awarded a Silver Medal of Army Valour, which was affixed to the battalion's flag.

Initially the battalion consisted of a command, a command platoon, a transport and supply company, a medium workshop, and a vehicles park. In 1981 the battalion as reorganized and now consisted of a command, a command and services company, a supply company, a maintenance company, a medium transport company. After the end of the Cold War the Italian Army began a drawdown of its forces and a relocation of units from the country's Northeast to the country's South. On 30 April 1989 part of the battalion's personnel moved to Persano in the South of Italy to establish the Logistics Battalion "Persano" in preparation for the move of the 8th Mechanized Brigade "Garibaldi".

On 1 July 1991 the 8th Bersaglieri Brigade "Garibaldi" became operational. On the same the date the Logistic Battalion "Garibaldi" became operational in its new base in Persano. On 1 February 2001 the battalion left the Garibaldi and joined the Logistic Projection Brigade. On 15 June 2001 the battalion was reformed as 10th Maneuver Regiment and now consisted of a regimental command, a supply battalion, a maintenance battalion, and a medical unit.

On 12 September 2013 the Logistic Projection Command was disbanded and the 10th Maneuver Regiment returned to the Garibaldi. On 1 January 2015 the regiment was renamed Logistic Regiment "Garibaldi" and reorganized as a brigade supporting logistic regiment.

Current structure 

Like all Italian Army brigade logistic units the Logistic Regiment "Garibaldi" consists of:

  Regimental Command, in Persano
 Logistic Battalion
 Command
 Tactical Control Squad
 Supply Company
 Transport Company
 Maintenance Company
 Command and Logistic Support Company
 C3 Platoon
 Transport and Materiel Platoon
 Deployment Support Platoon
 Commissariat Platoon
 Garrison Support Unit

The Regimental Command consists of the Commandant's and Personnel Office, the Operations, Training and Information Office, the Logistic Office, and the Administration Office.

See also 
 Military logistics

External links
Italian Army Website: Reggimento Logistico "Garibaldi"

References 

Logistic Regiments of Italy